The Northeastern Statistical Region (Albanian: Rajoni verilindor) is one of eight arbitrary statistical regions in North Macedonia. It borders Kosovo and Serbia to the north and Bulgaria to the east, while internally, it borders the Skopje and Eastern statistical regions.

Municipalities

Northeastern Statistical Region is divided into six municipalities:
.
.
.
.
.
.

Demographics

Population
The current population of the Northeastern Statistical Region is 172,787 citizens or 8.5% of the total population of North Macedonia, according to the last population census in 2002.

Ethnicities

The largest group in the region is the Macedonians. Albanians, Serbs, and Roma also account for a significant population.

References

Statistical regions of North Macedonia